German submarine U-1017 was a Type VIIC/41 U-boat built for Nazi Germany's Kriegsmarine for service during World War II.
She was laid down on 19 April 1943 by Blohm & Voss, Hamburg as yard number 217, launched on 1 March 1944 and commissioned on 13 April 1944 under Kapitänleutnant Victor Graf von Reventlow-Criminil.

Design
Like all Type VIIC/41 U-boats, U-1017 had a displacement of  when at the surface and  while submerged.

U-1017 was fitted with five  torpedo tubes (four fitted at the bow and one at the stern), fourteen torpedoes or 26 TMA or TMB Naval mines, one  SK C/35 naval gun, (220 rounds), one  Flak M42 and two  C/30 anti-aircraft guns. Its complement was between forty-four and sixty.

Service history
The boat's service career began on 13 April 1944 with the 31st Training Flotilla, followed by active service with 11th Flotilla on 1 November 1944. U-1017 took part in no wolfpacks U-1017 was sunk by depth charges and a FIDO homing torpedo dropped by a RAF Liberator bomber of 120 Squadron on 29 April 1945 in the North Atlantic, NW of Ireland in position .

Summary of raiding history

See also
 Battle of the Atlantic

References

Bibliography

German Type VIIC/41 submarines
U-boats commissioned in 1944
U-boats sunk in 1945
World War II submarines of Germany
1944 ships
World War II shipwrecks in the Atlantic Ocean
U-boats sunk by British aircraft
Ships lost with all hands
Ships built in Hamburg
Maritime incidents in April 1945